Ștefan Ștefănescu (born 24 May 1929, Goicea, Dolj County) is a Romanian historian, titular member (since 1992) of the Romanian Academy.

References

1929 births
Living people
Titular members of the Romanian Academy
20th-century Romanian historians
21st-century Romanian historians
Romanian medievalists
People from Dolj County